The 2014–15 Mauritanian Premier League season was the 35th season of the premier association football league in Mauritania.

Tevragh-Zeina won their second title after defeating Sélibaby at the Olympic Stadium in Nouakchott.

Teams

A total of 14 teams contest the league, including 12 sides from the 2013–14 season and two promoted from the 2013–14 second division.

League table

Mauritanian Premier League seasons
Mauritania
1